PalaCatania is an indoor sports arena, located in Catania, Italy. The capacity of the arena is 5,000 spectators.

It has hosted some matches of the 2010 FIVB Volleyball Men's World Championship.

References

Indoor arenas in Italy
Sports venues in Catania